Champ is 2011 South Korean film is about a former horse jockey who became blind after losing his wife in an accident, but now gets a second chance with the help of his daughter and an injured horse.

Plot
Two damaged souls race together for the race of their lifetime. Horse jockey Seung-ho loses his wife in a fatal car accident. The accident also leaves him practically blind. No longer able to work, he leads an aimless life with his little daughter. Things take turn for the worse when he loses all his savings after trying to cheat at the horse track and flees to a remote ranch in Jeju Island. There he meets a violent and limping horse named Woo-bak and he trains the horse for racing. Against all odds, Seung-ho and Woo-bak finish first in the preliminaries but when Seung-ho's blindness is discovered by the officials, they're disqualified from the finals. Woo-bak rejects all other jockeys and waits for Seung-ho to come back. The limping horse and his blind jockey bet everything to race one last time.

Cast
Cha Tae-hyun as Seung-ho
Kim Su-jung as Ye-seung
Yu Oh-seong as Trainer Yoon
Park Ha-sun as Yoon-hee
Park Won-sang as Trainer Kim
Baek Do-bin as Sung-hyun 
Kim Kwang-kyu as Kwang-kyu
Yoon Hee-seok as In-kwon 
Kim Ki-cheon as Director Park 
Kim Sang-ho as Sheriff 
Son Byeong-Ok as Gganjookyi 
Lee Yun-hee as Seung-ho's wife 
Baek Yoon-sik as President of horse riding association

Box office
The film was released in South Korea on September 7, 2011. The film grossed  on its opening weekend, ranking at number 6 with 112,513 admissions. In total the film grossed  and had 535,766 admissions nationwide.

References

External links
  
 Champ at Jidam Inc. 
 
 
 

2011 films
2010s sports drama films
South Korean sports drama films
Films set in Jeju
Films shot in Jeju
Showbox films
2010s Korean-language films
Films directed by Lee Hwan-kyung
2011 drama films
2010s South Korean films